SMS: Sin Miedo a Soñar is a Spanish teen drama daily television series. Produced by Globomedia, it was the first Spanish television series aired on laSexta. It was broadcast from July 2006 to March 2007.

Premise 
The plot revolves around a group of well-off teenagers studying at the elitist Los Castaños school whose lives change after the arrival of the lower-class Edu, who after escaping from a youth remand centre, is being foster cared by Cristina, a lawyer.

Cast 
 Mario Casas as Javi Llorens.
 Amaia Salamanca as Paula.
 Yon González as Andrés.
 María Castro as Lucía.
 Raúl Peña as Edu Sánchez.
  as Sonia.
  as Paco.
  as Juan.
 María León as Leti.
 Pablo Penedo as Sebas.
 Lola Marceli as Cristina.
  as David.
  as Gonzalo.
  as Luisa.
 Marta Hazas as Vicky.
 Martiño Rivas as Moisés.
 Sergio Mur.
 María Cotiello as Eva.
 Jesús Ruyman as Pepe.
  as Julia.

Production and release 
Aiming to attract a young audience to the newly born laSexta, it was the first Spanish series aired on the channel. SMS was also presented as the "first daily television series aired in prime time" in Spanish television. Created by Daniel Écija, Carmen Ortiz and Ernesto Pozuelo, the series was produced by Globomedia.  worked as casting director. It premiered on 10 July 2006. It comprised 2 seasons featuring 185 episodes with a running time of around 22 minutes. The second season began airing on 1 January 2007. The broadcasting run ended on 30 March 2007. The series proved to be a cradle for highly coveted actors in Spanish television.

References 

LaSexta original programming
Spanish teen drama television series
2000s Spanish drama television series
2006 Spanish television series debuts
2007 Spanish television series endings
2000s school television series
2000s teen drama television series
Spanish-language television shows
Television series about teenagers
Television series by Globomedia